The 2018–19 Florida Atlantic Owls women's basketball team represents Florida Atlantic University during the 2018–19 NCAA Division I women's basketball season. The Owls, led by second year head coach Jim Jabir, play their home games at FAU Arena and are members of Conference USA. They finished the season 5–25, 2–14 in C-USA play to finish in a 3 way tie for twelfth place. They lost in the first round of the C-USA women's tournament to Old Dominion.

Roster

Schedule

|-
!colspan=9 style=| Exhibition

|-
!colspan=9 style=| Non-conference regular season

|-
!colspan=9 style=| Conference USA regular season

|-
!colspan=9 style=| Conference USA Women's Tournament

See also
2018–19 Florida Atlantic Owls men's basketball team

References

Florida Atlantic Owls women's basketball seasons
Florida Atlantic